Allan Quatermain and the Temple of Skulls is a 2008 American adventure film directed by Mark Atkins and starring Sean Cameron Michael, Christopher Adamson, Sanaa Lathane, Daniel Bonjour, and Wittly Jourdan. It was created by The Asylum. The film follows the adventures of explorer Allan Quatermain, and was filmed entirely on location in South Africa. It was released directly to DVD.

The film is a mockbuster of Indiana Jones and the Kingdom of the Crystal Skull, and while the film contains some elements similar to Crystal Skull, the film itself is a loose adaptation of the 1885 novel King Solomon's Mines by H. Rider Haggard.

Plot 
The adventurer Allan Quatermain has been recruited to lead a British-American expedition in search of a fabled treasure deep within unexplored Africa. Throughout the film, Quatermain must avoid hidden dangers, violent natives and other unseen traps during their quest for the treasure of the Temple of Skulls, travelling by train, river and air to reach his goal, while being pursued by rival treasure-seekers and unfriendly natives who wish to sabotage his expedition.

Main cast 
 Sean Cameron Michael as Allan Quatermain
 Christopher Adamson as Hartford
 Natalie Stone as Lady Anna
 Daniel Bonjour as Sir Henry
 Wittly Jourdan as Umbopa

References

External links 
 
 Allan Quatermain and the Temple of Skulls at The Asylum
 Allan Quatermain and the Temple of Skulls at TCMDB
 
 Review of film at MTV
 Zone Troopers: Website about the different Allan Quatermain and King Solomon's Mine films

2008 films
2000s action adventure films
2000s fantasy adventure films
2008 independent films
American action adventure films
The Asylum films
Direct-to-video adventure films
Films based on King Solomon's Mines
Films set in Africa
Films shot in South Africa
Treasure hunt films
Zulu-language films
Films directed by Mark Atkins
Parody films based on Indiana Jones films
2000s parody films
2008 comedy films
2000s English-language films
2000s American films
2008 multilingual films
American multilingual films